The surname Noir (literally meaning "black" in French) may refer to:

 Christel Noir, French author, screenwriter, and artist.
 Jim Noir (born 1982), English singer-songwriter
 Ricardo Noir (born 1987), Boca Juniors football player
 Victor Noir (1848–1870), French journalist killed by Prince Pierre Bonaparte

Fictional
 Jack Noir, a character in the webcomic Homestuck
 Guy Noir, a character in A Prairie Home Companion radio show
 Vince Noir, a character in the BBC television comedy The Mighty Boosh

French-language surnames